Ghost Stations is a series of books by the British military historian Bruce Barrymore Halpenny, containing ostensibly true ghost and mystery stories generally connected to the RAF, airfields and other military or war connected stories.

History 

Bruce Halpenny had been writing ghost stories in the 1960s and encountering ghost stories in his exhaustive research into airfield histories, when he decided they should form the subject of a special book, and so started to add to and research his “ghost-mystery” files about abandoned airfields that "murmur and whisper with ghosts". Halpenny had by 1984 become acknowledged as a respected British military historian, expert in airfield histories, and expert in "RAF ghosts", especially surrounding airfields.

In the 1960s, Halpenny began presenting what he believed to be evidence of paranormal activity on airfields. He also campaigned for the British government to do their part by preserving a Second World War airfield in its original condition for future generations to see, and for the history of each airfield to be recorded fully and the men and sacrifice never forgotten.

Ghost Stations was officially launched at RAF Wittering on Thursday 16 October 1986. The book took 18 months to compile and drew upon the author's knowledge and experience working in airfields and documenting their history. Ghost Stations proved a best seller and was followed by a second book, entitled, Aaargh! that was published with over 30 "ghostly and mysterious" tales, one of which was "The eerie mystery of Lightning 894". Aaargh!, was later to become Ghost Stations 2 as six more books followed over the years.

GHOST STATIONS became a trademark in the late 1980s and in 2008 the new Ghost Stations series, based on the original series, was brought out. In the new series the stories had been shuffled around and merged, thus a story that was being investigated by Bruce Halpenny that was in several books in the old series, were merged into one story in one book in the new series. Also regional books were created in the new series, with Ghost Stations Lincolnshire, already for some Lincolnshire bookshops, one of their best sellers. The author's son, commercial artist, book editor and writer, Baron Barrymore Halpenny had a hand in the book cover design from the original series to the new series.

The author expresses his beliefs in the supernatural:

The original series of Ghost Stations books 

The original eight Ghost Stations books were:

Ghost Stations (Paperback)
Aaargh! (Paperback) – Later retitled Ghost Stations 2
Ghost Stations 3 (Paperback) 
Ghost Stations 4 (Paperback)  
Ghost Stations 5 (Paperback) 
Ghost Stations 6 (Paperback) 
Ghost Stations 7 (Paperback) 
Ghost Stations 8 (Paperback)

The new series of Ghost Stations books 

The new Ghost Stations books (as of 2008), published by L'Aquila Publishing:

Ghost Stations 1 (Paperback) 
Ghost Stations 2 (Paperback)  
Ghost Stations 3 (Paperback) 
Ghost Stations 4 (Paperback) 
Ghost Stations 5 (Paperback) 
Ghost Stations Mysteries (Paperback) 
Ghost Stations  Lincolnshire (Paperback)  
Ghost Stations  Yorkshire (Paperback) 
Ghost Stations  Germany (Paperback) 
Ghost Stations The Story (Paperback)

External links 
 Official Website for the Ghost Stations books

References

1986 books
Novels set during World War II
History of aviation
Occult books
Works by Bruce Barrymore Halpenny
Books about military history
Aviation books
Ghost novels